CMRS may refer to:

 Capability-based Module Readiness System - see Expeditionary Air Wing
 Centre for Medieval and Renaissance Studies - Program for international students (mainly American) to study in Oxford.
 Certified Manager of Reporting Services - see National Court Reporters Association
 Classical, Mediaeval and Renaissance Studies - see University of Saskatchewan Academics
 Certified Medical Reimbursement Specialist
 Council-certified Microbial Remediation Supervisor, a professional certification
 Child Mania Rating Scale, a psychological screening tool for bipolar disorder
 Commercial Mobile Radio Service, a United States regulatory category of Mobile phone